In the mathematical theory of artificial neural networks, universal approximation theorems are results that establish the density of an algorithmically generated class of functions within a given function space of interest.  Typically, these results concern the approximation capabilities of the feedforward architecture on the space of continuous functions between two Euclidean spaces, and the approximation is with respect to the compact convergence topology.

However, there are also a variety of results between non-Euclidean spaces and other commonly used architectures and, more generally, algorithmically generated sets of functions, such as the convolutional neural network (CNN) architecture, radial basis-functions, or neural networks with specific properties. Most universal approximation theorems can be parsed into two classes. The first quantifies the approximation capabilities of neural networks with an arbitrary number of artificial neurons ("arbitrary width" case) and the second focuses on the case with an arbitrary number of hidden layers, each containing a limited number of artificial neurons ("arbitrary depth" case). In addition to these two classes, there are also universal approximation theorems for neural networks with bounded number of hidden layers and a limited number of neurons in each layer ("bounded depth and bounded width" case).

Universal approximation theorems imply that neural networks can represent a wide variety of interesting functions when given appropriate weights. On the other hand, they typically do not provide a construction for the weights, but merely state that such a construction is possible.

History 
One of the first versions of the arbitrary width case was proven by George Cybenko in 1989 for sigmoid activation functions. Kurt Hornik, Maxwell Stinchcombe, and Halbert White showed in 1989 that multilayer feed-forward networks with as few as one hidden layer are universal approximators. Hornik also showed in 1991 that it is not the specific choice of the activation function but rather the multilayer feed-forward architecture itself that gives neural networks the potential of being universal approximators. Moshe Leshno et al in 1993 and later Allan Pinkus in 1999 showed that the universal approximation property is equivalent to having a nonpolynomial activation function.

The arbitrary depth case was also studied by a number of authors, such as Gustaf Gripenberg in 2003, Dmitry Yarotsky, Zhou Lu et al in 2017, Boris Hanin and Mark Sellke in 2018, and Patrick Kidger and Terry Lyons in 2020. In 2021, Park et al obtained the minimum width required for the universal approximation of Lp functions using feedforward neural networks with ReLU as activation functions. Similar results that can be directly applied to residual neural networks were also obtained in the same year by Paulo Tabuada and Bahman Gharesifard using control-theoretic arguments.

The bounded depth and bounded width case was first studied by Maiorov and Pinkus in 1999. They showed that there exists an analytic sigmoidal activation function such that two hidden layer neural networks with bounded number of units in hidden layers are universal approximators. 
Using algorithmic and computer programming techniques, Guliyev and Ismailov constructed a smooth sigmoidal activation function providing universal approximation property for two hidden layer feedforward neural networks with less units in hidden layers. It was constructively proved in 2018 paper that single hidden layer networks with bounded width are still universal approximators for univariate functions, but this property is no longer true for multivariable functions.

Several extensions of the theorem exist, such as to discontinuous activation functions, noncompact domains, certifiable networks, 
random neural networks, and alternative network architectures and topologies.

Arbitrary-width case 
A spate of papers in the 1980s -- 1990s, from George Cybenko and Kurt Hornik etc, established several universal approximation theorems for arbitrary width and bounded depth. See  for reviews. The following is the most often quoted:

Such an  can also be approximated by a network of greater depth by using the same construction for the first layer and approximating the identity function with later layers.

The problem with polynomials may be removed by allowing the outputs of the hidden layers to be multiplied together (the "pi-sigma networks"), yielding the generalization:

Arbitrary-depth case 
The 'dual' versions of the theorem consider networks of bounded width and arbitrary depth. A variant of the universal approximation theorem was proved for the arbitrary depth case by Zhou Lu et al. in 2017.  They showed that networks of width n+4 with ReLU activation functions can approximate any Lebesgue integrable function on n-dimensional input space with respect to  distance if network depth is allowed to grow. It was also shown that if the width was less than or equal to n, this general expressive power to approximate any Lebesgue integrable function was lost. In the same paper it was shown that ReLU networks with width n+1 were sufficient to approximate any continuous function of n-dimensional input variables.  The following refinement, specifies the optimal minimum width for which such an approximation is possible and is due to.

Universal approximation theorem (L1 distance, ReLU  activation, arbitrary depth, minimal width). For any Bochner–Lebesgue p-integrable function  and any , there exists a fully-connected ReLU network  of width exactly , satisfying

.

If, moreover, the target function  is smooth then the required number of layer and their width can be exponentially smaller. Even if  is not smooth, the curse of dimensionality can be broken if f admits additional "compositional structure".  

Together, the central result of  yields the following universal approximation theorem for networks with bounded width (cf. also  for the first result of this kind).

Universal approximation theorem (Uniform non-affine activation, arbitrary depth, constrained width). Let  be any non-affine continuous function which is continuously differentiable at at least one point, with nonzero derivative at that point. Let  denote the space of feed-forward neural networks with  input neurons,  output neurons, and an arbitrary number of hidden layers each with  neurons, such that every hidden neuron has activation function  and every output neuron has the identity as its activation function, with input layer , and output layer . Then given any  and any , there exists  such that

 

Quantitative Refinement: The number of layers and the width of each layer required to approximate f to  precision known; moreover, the result hold true when  and are replaced with any non-positively curved Riemannian manifold.   

Certain necessary conditions for the bounded width, arbitrary depth case have been established, but there is still a gap between the known sufficient and necessary conditions.

Bounded depth and bounded width case 

The first result on approximation capabilities of neural networks with bounded number of layers, each containing a limited number of artificial neurons was obtained by Maiorov and Pinkus. Their remarkable result revealed that such networks can be universal approximators and for achieving this property two hidden layers are enough.
Universal approximation theorem: There exists an activation function  which is analytic, strictly increasing and
sigmoidal and has the following property: For any   and  there exist constants , and vectors   for which

for all .

This is an existence result. It says that activation functions providing universal approximation property for bounded depth bounded width networks exist. Using certain algorithmic and computer programming techniques, Guliyev and Ismailov efficiently constructed such activation functions depending on a numerical parameter.  The developed algorithm allows one to compute the activation functions at any point of the real axis instantly. For the algorithm and the corresponding computer code see. The theoretical result can be formulated as follows.
Universal approximation theorem: Let    be  a finite segment of the real line,  and   be any positive number.

1) For any   and   there exist numbers   and   such that for all 

holds for all .

In addition, all the coefficients , except one, are equal.

Here “ is -strictly increasing on some set ” means that there exists a strictly increasing function  such that  for all . Clearly, a -increasing function behaves like a usual increasing function as  gets small.
In the "depth-width" terminology, the above theorem says that for certain activation functions depth- width- networks are universal approximators for univariate functions and depth- width- networks are universal approximators for -variable functions.

Graph input 

Achieving useful universal function approximation on graphs (or rather on graph isomorphism classes) has been a longstanding problem. The popular graph convolutional neural networks (GCNs or GNNs) can be made as discriminative as the Weisfeiler–Leman graph isomorphism test. In 2020, a universal approximation theorem result was established by Brüel-Gabrielsson, showing that graph representation with certain injective properties is sufficient for universal function approximation on bounded graphs and restricted universal function approximation on unbounded graphs, with an accompanying #edges#nodes-runtime method that performed at state of the art on a collection of benchmarks.

See also 
 Kolmogorov–Arnold representation theorem
 Representer theorem
 No free lunch theorem
 Stone–Weierstrass theorem
 Fourier series

References 

Theorems in analysis
Artificial neural networks
Network architecture
Networks